A significant severe weather and tornado outbreak affected multiple regions of the Eastern United States in mid-April 2019. Over the course of 40 hours, 75 tornadoes touched down. The outbreak produced numerous strong tornadoes throughout portions of the Deep South, while additional significant tornadoes occurred as far north as Ohio, Pennsylvania, and Delaware. The most significant tornado of the event was a long-tracked, high-end EF3 tornado that struck Alto, Texas and killed two people. Numerous weak tornadoes were also confirmed, along with numerous reports of hail and damaging straight line winds.

A total of nine people were killed during this outbreak of severe weather. Three fatalities occurred as a result of the tornadoes that struck Alto, Texas and Hamilton, Mississippi. In addition, six other non-tornadic fatalities were also associated with this storm event. On April 13, two children aged 3 and 8 were killed in Pollok, Texas after a tree fell on and crushed the vehicle they were riding in. In Louisiana, two more people were killed as a result of flash flooding in Monroe and Bawcomville. On April 14, a rescue worker in Alabama was struck by a vehicle while clearing debris off a roadway, killing him. An additional fatality occurred on April 15 when a tree fell on a home in Stafford, Virginia, killing an occupant.

Meteorological synopsis

April 13
The first indications for an organized severe weather event came on April 9, when the Storm Prediction Center (SPC) outlined a risk area across much of the Ark-La-Tex region. The following day, a broader region for severe thunderstorms was introduced, with a heightened threat level across far eastern Texas into western Mississippi. A day 3 enhanced risk was outlined across those same regions on April 11, although SPC noted concerns about system timing and the availability of instability as numerous storms developed. As weather models came into broad consensus with regard to the potential for discrete supercell thunderstorms and a succeeding squall line, confidence in a significant severe weather outbreak increased, prompting the SPC to issue a day 2 moderate risk across far eastern Texas, northern Louisiana, southeastern Arkansas, and far western Mississippi. The moderate risk was extended eastward on the morning of April 13, and SPC forecasters contemplated issuing a high risk for portions of the area. Ultimately, however, lingering concerns about the longevity of discrete storms precluded such an upgrade.

The synoptic scale setup was expected to come together as a vigorous upper-level trough pushed eastward across the Southwest United States into the Southern Plains, developing a closed 500mb low near the Dallas–Fort Worth metroplex late on April 13. At the surface, a primary area of low pressure was forecast to develop near San Angelo, Texas, supporting a trailing cold front across central Texas as well as a lifting warm front across the Ark-La-Tex region. Steep lapse rates were forecast to contribute to mid-level Convective Available Potential Energy (CAPE) values of 2,500–3,000 J/kg across eastern Texas, with slightly lower values of 1,000–2,000 J/kg over portions of Louisiana and Mississippi. Intense speed and directional shear throughout the entirety of the atmosphere led to large, looping hodographs, and effective storm relative helicity values ranging from 250 to 600 J/kg along and south of the aforementioned warm front as depicted by forecast atmospheric soundings. The culmination of these ingredients was forecast to support an outbreak of supercell thunderstorms across the Moderate risk, with the potential for strong to violent (EF2+) tornadoes with the most sustained cells, followed by the development of an eastward-progressing squall line overnight. As the event itself unfolded, numerous supercell thunderstorms and embedded semi-discrete supercell structures overspread the threat area, resulting in numerous strong tornadoes.

April 14–15
On April 10, the SPC noted the potential for organized severe weather farther east across the United States, encompassing portions of Alabama, Georgia, South Carolina, and Florida in their day 5 threat area valid for April 14. Minimal changes were made in the next day's outlook, before the outlook was expanded northward into the Ohio Valley, including the introduction of an enhanced risk from central Alabama and Georgia into southern Ohio. Into April 14, as a line of severe thunderstorms shifted eastward across the Southern United States, this Enhanced risk was pushed north to encompass more of the Ohio Valley and portions of the Mid-Atlantic states. This included a large 5% risk area for tornadoes. There, cool morning temperatures were expected to give way to sufficient destabilization, characterized by mid-level CAPE values around 500–1,000 J/kg. Despite an intense low-level jet, dewpoints were only expected to rise into the upper 50s to near 60 °F, mitigating a more substantial tornado threat as severe thunderstorm clusters were forecast to congeal into a squall line overnight. While storm mode during the event was mostly linear, several supercell thunderstorms did develop, resulting in a few significant tornadoes. Numerous circulations and semi-discrete supercell structures embedded within the line of storms produced numerous weak tornadoes as well. Tornado activity continued throughout portions of the Northeastern United States into the early morning hours of April 15 before the outbreak came to an end. One tornado in the Northeast, an EF2 in Delaware, became the strongest tornado in the state since 2004.

Confirmed tornadoes

April 13 event

April 14 event

April 15 event

Weches–Weeping Mary–Alto–Sacul, Texas

This long-tracked, high-end EF3 tornado touched down east-northeast of Crockett, Texas in Houston County at 1:00 p.m. CDT (1:00 UTC), downing numerous trees at EF1 intensity as it tracked to the northeast through the Davy Crockett National Forest. The tornado intensified to low-end EF3 strength as it passed near Weches, where a large swath of trees was flattened and an anchored double-wide manufactured home was thrown  and obliterated, killing the occupant. Continuing into Cherokee County, the tornado maintained its strength as it closely followed Texas State Highway 21 and struck the rural community of Weeping Mary, where approximately 20 homes and mobile homes were severely damaged or destroyed. The roof and exterior walls of the Caddo Mounds State Historic Site museum were destroyed while people were running inside for safety, resulting in several injuries and another fatality. Some outbuildings were damaged or destroyed as well. High-end EF3 damage occurred as the tornado then struck the town of Alto, where a two-story brick home was swept from its foundation, with the first floor completely destroyed and the second floor left partially intact and displaced downwind from the foundation. Metal power poles were bent in half, and several other homes and mobile homes in and around town were damaged or destroyed. Alto had already sustained damage from a separate EF2 tornado that struck the town earlier in the day.

The tornado exited Alto and continued to the northeast, where numerous trees were snapped, denuded, and partially debarked at low-end EF3 intensity. A home in this area had half of its second story torn off, and a second home was shifted off of its foundation and lost much of its roof. Damage to these two structures was rated EF2. Farther along the path, EF1 tree damage occurred as the tornado moved through sparsely populated wooded areas. The tornado then struck the small town of Sacul at EF1 strength, where trees and power poles were downed, headstones were shifted at a cemetery in town, and a flagpole was bent over. A frame home lost a large portion of its roof, and several trees were blown over onto the structure. Past Sacul, the tornado began moving nearly due-north as it approached and crossed into Rusk County. A final area of significant damage occurred near the county line east-southeast of Reklaw, where a well-built home had a large portion of its roof torn off at EF2 intensity. The tornado continued through southwestern Rusk County before it weakened and dissipated at 2:00 p.m. CDT (19:00 UTC), after downing additional trees at EF0 to EF1 intensity. Along the entirety of its path, this tornado snapped, debarked, or uprooted thousands of trees.

See also
 List of North American tornadoes and tornado outbreaks
 List of United States tornadoes in April 2019

Notes

References

2019 in Alabama
2019 in Louisiana
2019 in Mississippi
2019 in Texas
2019 natural disasters in the United States
April 2019 events in the United States
Tornadoes of 2019